Kristi Gannon (born April 13, 1982 in Escondido, California) is a field hockey defense and midfield player from the United States, who made her international senior debut for the Women's National Team in 2001. She attended the University of Michigan, where she played for the Wolverines. Her sister Kelli was also a member of the US National Team.

International senior tournaments
 2001 – Pan American Cup, Kingston, Jamaica (2nd)
 2004 – Olympic Qualifying Tournament, Auckland, New Zealand (6th)
 2004 – Pan American Cup, Bridgetown, Barbados (2nd)
 2005 – Champions Challenge, Virginia Beach, United States (5th)
 2006 – World Cup Qualifier, Rome, Italy (4th)
 2006 – World Cup, Madrid, Spain (6th)

References
 Profile on US Field Hockey

1982 births
Living people
American female field hockey players
Michigan Wolverines field hockey players
Sportspeople from Escondido, California
Female field hockey defenders
Female field hockey midfielders